Lordamercy Cove is a valley in the U.S. state of Georgia. It forms the boundary between Union and White counties.

Lordamercy Cove was descriptively so named on account of its difficult terrain.

References

Landforms of Union County, Georgia
Valleys of Georgia (U.S. state)